Odin Teatret is an avant-garde theatre group based in Holstebro, Denmark. It was founded by Italian theatre director and investigator Eugenio Barba in 1964. Odin Teatret is a part of NTL, Nordisk Teaterlaboratorium,  which also includes the International School of Theatre Anthropology (ISTA), founded in 1979, and the Centre for Theatre Laboratory Studies (CTLS), founded in 2002

Background and History

In 1961, Italian theatre student Eugenio Barba left his studies at the State Theatre School in Warsaw to join Jerzy Grotowski at Teatr 13 Rzędów in Opole. After three years with Grotowski, Barba travelled to India where he learned Kathakali, then returned to Oslo with the intention of becoming a theatre director. As a foreigner in Norway he found this was not easy, so he formed his own company, Odin Teatret, in October 1964. The company members were young people who had failed to gain admission to the Oslo State Theatre School and they rehearsed their first production in an air raid shelter.

In 1965, the Danish municipality of Holstebro invited Odin Teatret to create a theatre laboratory there, offering an old farm and a small sum of money. Nordisk Teaterlaboratorium was established as the umbrella organisation for  Odin Teatret and all its activities. Since 1984, Odin Teatret has been a self-governing institution and today it has a permanent salaried staff of 18 people (including actors, technicians and administrative staff).

In 1979, Barba founded ISTA, the International School of Theatre Anthropology as an itinerant university and multicultural network of performers and scholars whose common field of study is theatre anthropology. Since 1990, ISTA in collaboration with the University of Bologna has organised the University of Eurasian Theatre, holding conferences and encounters of a theoretical-practical character. Another of the ISTA activities is Theatrum Mundi, a performance montage of scenes drawn from the repertoire of the physical scores of the Asian and Odin actors.

In 1992, the Centre for Theatre Laboratory Studies (CTLS) was established at Odin Teatret in collaboration with Aarhus University. As well as documenting and archiving all of Odin Teatret's activities, CTLS is researching the contribution of contemporary and historic theatre laboratories, promoting exchange between national and international theatre networks, and initiating seminars and conferences on theatre laboratories as a creative professional and theoretical environment.

Company

Founding Director Eugenio Barba continues to lead the company, and some of the original actors are still with the company. The current (2018) company of actors is Luis Alonso, Kai Bredholt, Roberta Carreri, Jan Ferslev, Elena Floris, Donald Kitt, Tage Larsen, Else Marie Laukvik (founding member), Caroline Pizarro, Iben Nagel Rasmussen, Julia Varley, Frans Winther, Parvathy Baul and I Wayan Bawa.

Founding member Torgeir Wethal died in June 2010 making him the first Odin Teatret member to be buried in the Odin "family grave" in Holstebro.

Performances

Odin Teatret has created some 74 performances, of which about 25 are still in its current repertoire. A full list of performances can be found on the company's web site.  The most recent performance is The Tree, which premiered in September 2016 and is now touring world wide.

Publications

Odin Teatret's publishing activities began in the 1960s with the publication of the magazine T.T.T. (Teatrets Teori og Teknikk) and Jerzy Grotowski’s book Towards a Poor Theatre, which was translated into more than fifteen languages. Today it publishes books about Odin Teatret and ISTA; videos of Odin Teatret's performances, pedagogy and training; videos of other practitioners' productions and pedagogy; music; posters; and the journal The Open Page (in association with the Magdalena Project).

Bibliography

The Floating Islands: Reflections with Odin Teatret, by Eugenio Barba, Ferdinando Taviani, published by Drama, 1979

A Dictionary of Theatre Anthropology: The Secret Art of the Performer, by Eugenio Barba, Nicola Savarese, International School of Theatre Anthropology (Holstebro, Denmark), Richard Fowler, translated by Richard Fowler, published by Routledge, 1991, 

Towards a Third Theatre: Eugenio Barba and the Odin Teatret, by Ian Watson, Watson Ian, Richard Schechner, published by Routledge, 1995, 

The Paper Canoe: A Guide to Theatre Anthropology, by Eugenio Barba, Richard Fowler, translated by Richard Fowler, published by Routledge, 1995, 

Land of Ashes and Diamonds: My Apprenticeship in Poland - Followed by 26 Letters from Jerzy Grotowski to Eugenio Barba, by Eugenio Barba, Jerzy Grotowski, published by Black Mountain Press, 1999, 

Odin Teatret 2000, by John Andreasen, Annelis Kuhlmann, published by Aarhus University Press, 2000, 

Negotiating Cultures: Eugenio Barba and the Intercultural Debate, by Ian Watson, published by Manchester University Press, 2002, 

Eugenio Barba, by Jane Turner, published by Routledge, 2004,

External links
 Odin Teatret
 Odin Teatret Archives

Theatres in Denmark
Theatre companies in Denmark
1964 establishments in Denmark
Holstebro